2020 Academy Awards may refer to:

 92nd Academy Awards, the Academy Awards ceremony that took place in 2020, honoring the best in film for 2019
 93rd Academy Awards, the Academy Awards ceremony that took place in 2021, honoring the best in film for January 2020 through February 2021